Joseph Antoine Émile Bourdon (14 February 1884 – 11 July 1974) was a 20th-century French organist and composer.

Biography 
Bourdon was the son of Magdelaine Louise Villate de Peufeilhoux (of noble descent) and Victor-Louis-Gabriel Bourdon (a financier). Later, he became a pupil of Alexandre Guilmant in the Conservatoire de Paris, Bourdon was a condisciple and friend of Marcel Dupré.

He was the organist of the great organ of the Saint Nicholas Cathedral of Monaco from 1922 to 1968, before canon Henri Carol succeeded him.

In addition, he was professor of organ at the Académie de Musique Fondation Prince Rainier III until 1968.

His wife Jeanne Barbezat passed away on 17 August 1974, and Bourdon himself died on 11 July of that year.

Works 
Bourdon is the author of several pieces for pipe organ including:
 Dix Pièces Op. 7 (Paris, Leduc, 1921) :
 Offertoire pour la Fête de l'Assomption 
 Carillons (popularised by Marcel Dupré) 
 Méditation sur un Psaume d'Introït 
 Sortie sur l'Hymne Veni Creator Spiritus 
 Bénédiction nuptiale 
 In memoriam 
 Sur l'Alleluia de la Fête de saint Louis 
 Légende pour la Toussaint 
 Triptyque sur la Prose de la Fête-Dieu 
 Toccata sur deux noëls
 Six Pièces (1926) (Delatour, 2009) :
 Thème développé
 Final en Ré
 Complainte
 Communion sur "Dic nobis, Maria" de la prose de Pâques
 Allegro symphonique
 Elégie
 Première symphonie Op.10 (Paris, Leduc, 1925)
 Marche Solennelle Op. 19 (Paris, Bornemann, 1947)
 Cortège Nuptial Op. 38, dedicated to H.R.H. Prince Rainier III and to Madame la Princesse Grace de Monaco, for the celebration of their marriage on 19 April 1956 (unpublished).

Other:
 Andantino religioso for organ and cello (or alto)
 Tantum ergo for choir, organ and horn  
 Idylle for orchestra 
 Poème élégiaque for cello and orchestra 
 Trio en mi mineur for piano, violin and cello
 Sacred motets.

Sources 
 Bourdon (1884-1974) organiste et compositeur, Louis Sauvé. - preface by Marie-Claire Alain, Éditions De L'officine, 2004, 342 p.
 Émile Bourdon, Six Pièces pour orgue

External links 
 Amis de Marcel Dupré
 Émile BOURDON on Delatour France
 Émile BOURDON (1884-1974), organiste et compositeur l'Éducation musicale
 Méditation, Émile Bourdon on YouTube

Conservatoire de Paris alumni
Composers for pipe organ
20th-century classical composers
French classical organists
French male organists
French classical composers
French male classical composers
1884 births
1974 deaths
People from Allier
20th-century organists
20th-century French composers
20th-century French male musicians
Male classical organists